The Beyoncé Experience Live is the third live and fourth video album by American singer Beyoncé. It was released through Columbia Records and Music World Entertainment on November 20, 2007 in the United States. It was filmed at the Staples Center in Los Angeles, California, on September 2, 2007 during her world tour The Beyoncé Experience. It features guest appearances from rapper Jay-Z on "Upgrade U" and former Destiny's Child bandmates Michelle Williams and Kelly Rowland on "Survivor". The show featured on the album was broadcast on different channels; for one night only on November 19, 2007, the film was shown in ninety-six theaters across the United States, while Black Entertainment Television (BET) aired an edited version of the concert on Thanksgiving Day, with AEG Network and 3sat also airing the concert.

The album features performances of songs from Beyoncé's first two solo studio albums Dangerously in Love (2003) and B'Day (2006) as well as songs which she recorded with Destiny's Child. Upon its release, The Beyoncé Experience Live received mostly positive reviews from music critics who praised Beyoncé's live performances of the songs. The album was also commercially successful, peaking at number two on the US Top Music Videos, and being certified triple platinum by the Recording Industry Association of America (RIAA). The live version of "Me, Myself and I" (2003) from the album gained a nomination for Grammy Award for Best Female R&B Vocal Performance at the 51st Annual Grammy Awards (2009). The show was re-enacted by American performer Neal Medlyn during his performance at the New Museum in New York City, New York in April 2008.

Background and development
The Beyoncé Experience Live was filmed at the Staples Center in Los Angeles, California, on September 2, 2007, during Beyoncé's world tour The Beyoncé Experience, in promotion of her second studio album B'Day (2006). The film features guest appearances from rapper Jay-Z on "Upgrade U" and former Destiny's Child bandmates Michelle Williams and Kelly Rowland on "Survivor". At the end of the show Rowland and Williams led the audience in singing "Happy Birthday to You" to Beyoncé, to mark her birthday two days later. The film also features a twenty-seven-song jukebox feature which was achieved by the use of advanced "bitwise" programming. The DVD was authored by Neil Matthews at Ascent Media in New York City.

Film synopsis

Onstage, Beyoncé had an all-female band Suga Mama, and the show used men only as dancers for the female audience as noted by Pareles of The New York Times. The show included many references such as to James Brown and Donna Summer as well as routines inspired by Sweet Charity and Marilyn Monroe. It opened in darkness with Beyoncé emerging through a hole in the stage amidst smoke, sparkles and pyrotechnics to perform "Crazy in Love" and a snippet of Gnarls Barkley's "Crazy" in a sparkling silver gown and walked to the front of the stage, as fifteen disco balls hung from the ceiling. Her background band started playing the music to the funk song and while singing, Beyoncé walked up a huge staircase which moved forward in two places where her all-female band and three backup singers were positioned. At the top of the staircase/mini-stage, she tore off the bottom of her dress and walked back down to the main stage. Her three backup singers came down as well and did the "uh-oh" dance from the song with her. 

During "Freakum Dress" Beyoncé played an air guitar, while the stage's stairs were lit green during "Green Light" which she performed with six female dancers. She wore a belly-dancing outfit, including harem pants, while singing "Baby Boy". She descended the staircase holding an umbrella and was met by three guys wearing fatigues. A short section of the reggae classic "Murder She Wrote" was incorporated into "Baby Boy". During "Beautiful Liar", Beyoncé sang into a microphone that fell from the ceiling and performed a Shakira-styled dance similar to the song's music video; Shakira appeared on the video screen throughout the song. "Naughty Girl" was also sung with Donna Summer's "Love to Love You Baby" being incorporated and while performing she belly-danced on the song's beat. "Me, Myself and I" was performed at a slower tempo than the original recording, after which Beyoncé sang "Dangerously in Love 2" with a snippet of "He Loves Me". She cried during "Flaws and All" and showed her "imperfections" before being embraced by a dancer dressed as an angel. During the performance of the song, she sang wide-eyed in a video close-up. Beyoncé sang "Speechless" while seated on a sofa designed like a pair of lips.

The intro to "Ring the Alarm" paid homage to the "Cell Block Tango" from the film Chicago, as women told of how they had been hurt by men and the performance saw Beyoncé wearing a red overcoat. During the performance of "Suga Mama", Beyoncé performed a pole dance. Afterwards Beyoncé's duets with Jay-Z – "Upgrade U" and "'03 Bonnie & Clyde" were performed. During "Get Me Bodied" she removed her robot costume to reveal black and yellow dress to emulate a bee and further led the crowd in a dance routine. "Check on It" was preceded by an instrumental of "The Pink Panther Theme", during which the stairs were colored pink. A Dreamgirls segment was performed, incorporating the title song and "Listen" from the 2006 musical film in which Beyoncé starred in. The final song on the tour's set list was "Irreplaceable"; it began with the audience singing the first verse to Beyoncé after she announced "I've been singing my heart out for over two hours. Now it's time for you to sing for me." Between segments of the show, Suga Mama performed periodic instrumental interludes, with every member giving a solo so Beyoncé could change her costumes seven times. The show included a ten-song Destiny's Child Medley which contained female solidarity-themed songs. As the concert ended, Beyoncé was walking on the stage and pointing to individual fans saying "I see you!" and describing their clothes or the signs they held.

Release
The Beyoncé Experience Live was released in the United States on November 20, 2007, and in the United Kingdom on November 26. The album was also released on the iTunes Store on November 19, 2007, in an audio edition titled The Beyoncé Experience: Live Audio. The Blu-ray was released on November 18, 2008 simultaneously with Beyoncé's third studio album, I Am... Sasha Fierce. In some countries, the live DVD was packed with Irreemplazable as a bonus disc. Some of the concerts live version instrumentations were made available for digital download on March 25, 2008, and included the songs from "Speechless" onward. Although it is credited as various artists, technically the album is performed by Beyoncé's tour band Suga Mama. The Beyoncé Experience Live was shown at ninety-six cinemas across the United States on November 19, 2007, one day before its DVD release. Black Entertainment Television (BET) broadcast the show on Thanksgiving Day on November 22, 2007 and later on December 18 the same year.
On December 31, 2007 The Beyoncé Experience Live was broadcast to members of the United States Army serving in the Iraq War through AEG Network. On December 31, 2008, European network 3sat aired the concert in Germany, Austria and Switzerland.

Critical reception
Mark Deming of the website AllMusic commented that the album "captures her dazzling live act as she shines in a performance." A writer of MTV News commented that the album contained "more than two hours' worth of content in total". Kurt Orzeck of the same publication commented that the DVD showcases a "huge" tour. Scott Kara of Time Out also praised the "thrilling, booty-shaking pizzazz" of the DVD adding that fans would feel "just like being there [on the concert]". An editor of the website Jam! graded the album with four out of five stars, calling it a spectacle. The editor further noted: "[It] has the giant stage, the massive lights, the troupe of dancers, the kickass all-girl band, the costume changes, the VIPs and more. But all of it can't pull focus from the incredible Ms. Knowles, who works it for two-plus hours, wailing and gyrating through a sweat-soaked show with nary a hair out of place." Grading the album with three out of four stars, Chuck Arnold and Ivory Jeff Clinton from People magazine wrote: "The elaborate production gets a bit overblown at times, but in this concert... the tireless diva is a veritable force of nature on high-energy numbers such as 'Crazy in Love' and 'Déjà Vu.'"

Accolades
The live version of "Me, Myself and I" (2003) from The Beyoncé Experience Live gained a nomination for Best Female R&B Vocal Performance at the 51st Annual Grammy Awards in 2009.

Commercial performance
On the chart issue dated March 1, 2008, The Beyoncé Experience Live peaked at number two on the US Top Music Videos chart and it also stayed on the same position the next week, behind Celine Dion's Live in Las Vegas: A New Day... at number one. On December 8, 2007, the album debuted and peaked at number twenty-three on the US Digital Albums. It has been certified triple platinum by the Recording Industry Association of America (RIAA). The album appeared at numbers four, eight and thirty-one on the US Top Music Videos year-end chart for 2008, 2009 and 2010, respectively.

For the week ending November 26, 2007, The Beyoncé Experience Live peaked at number two on the Spanish Music DVD Chart. On December 1, 2007 the album debuted and peaked at number six on the Belgian Music DVD Chart, and stayed at that position for the following two weeks, and its last position was at number nine on December 22, 2007 before it fell out of the chart. On the Dutch Music DVD Chart, The Beyoncé Experience Live debuted at number three on December 1, 2007 and after almost a year of ascending and descending the chart, it became its peak position. It appeared on the Dutch Music DVD year-end charts in 2008 and 2009 at numbers twenty-two and forty-eight, respectively. On November 14, 2009, The Beyoncé Experience Live peaked at number twenty-five on the UK Music DVD Chart. On September 21, 2009, the album peaked at number eight on the Australian Music DVD Chart and was later certified double platinum by the Australian Recording Industry Association (ARIA).

The Neal Medlyn Experience
American performer Neal Medlyn re-enacted the film during his performance at the New Museum in April 2008 together with dancers Will Rawls and Erick Montes. His performance was an hour long and titled The Neal Medlyn Experience Live. He sang along to the DVD audio track, complete with word-for-word between-song patter and band introductions. Booth Newspapers' Roger LeLeivre reviewed the re-enactment positively writing: "The event... was a hoot, and the audience loved every second of it. Medlyn has Beyoncé's signature, often spastic, moves down pat, down to each minute hand gesture and facial expression... Unlike a drag show, Medlyn does not try to convince anyone they are seeing Beyoncé. There wasn't much in the way of costumes (well, he did enter in a black wig, tube top and hot pants, but those bit the dust rather quickly), and why bother?". He concluded that the length of the show was "perfect" as it "ended before the shtick wore out its welcome". LeLeivre finished his review by writing, "It was a delicious pop-culture skewering, right down to the back-up dancers, with their over-the-top moves and expressions... Clearly it enhanced the 'experience,' if you had a passing acquaintance with Beyoncé's songs... but such knowledge was not a prerequisite to enjoying this homage". Claudia La Rocco of The New York Times described his re-enactment as "absurdly faithful" and added that it wouldn't have been nearly as "smart or touching" without the dancing of Rawls and Montes. She further put the performance in her list of the "richest" moments of 2008 and noted: "These astounding performers slipped between genders and among genres, enveloping Mr. Medlyn in utter fabulousness and proving just how sophisticated pop culture can be. Backup dancers everywhere should feel proud."

Track listing

Personnel
Credits adapted from The Beyoncé Experience Lives liner notes and AllMusic.

Mike Abbott – audio engineer
Glenn Ables – stage technician
Richard J. Alcock – executive producer
Calvin Aurand – executive producer
Angela Beyincé – art assistant, assistant
Beyoncé – primary artist, choreographer, concept, direction, executive producer, staging
Jason Bridges – lighting technician
Ed Burke – archivist
Anthony Burrell – choreographer, dance director, dancer
Kim Burse – concept, creative director
Thom Cadley – mixing
Jim Caruana – mixing
Anthony Catalano – assistant engineer, digital editing
Marcie Chapa – percussion
Guy Charbonneau – engineer
Fusako Chubachi – art direction
Justin Collie – lighting design, set design
Justin Cook – production assistant
Terry Cooley – stage manager
Montina Cooper – vocals (background)
Milan Dillard – dance director, dancer
James Fahlgren – setup
Michael Fellner – technical manager
Charlie Fernández – unspecified contributor role
Tia Fuller – sax (alto)
Jennifer García – layout design
Max Gousse – A&R
Todd Green – organ
Georgette Harvey – gaffer
Ty Hunter – assistant hair stylist
Jay-Z – guest artist, primary artist
Mark Johnson – camera operator
Harold Jones – production coordination
Chris Keating – video director
Chris Keene – lighting technician
Mathew Knowles – executive producer, management
Tina Knowles – stylist
Dave Levisohn – camera operator
Yanira Marin – dancer
Divinity Roxx -bass, musical director
Bibi McGill – guitar, musical direction, musical director
James "McGoo" McGregor – drum technician
Steve Miles – camera operator
Ramon Morales – monitor engineer
Heather Morris – dancer
Doug Neal – stage manager
Emer Patten – producer
Danielle Polanco – choreographer
Matt Powers – script supervisor
Justin Purser – production coordination
Dan Ricci – audio post-production
Jerry Rogers – camera operator, projection
Kelly Rowland – guest artist
Todd Sams – choreographer
Jamie Silk – production assistant
Kate Sinden – production coordination
Ryan Smith – mastering
Kim Thompson – drums
Francesca Tolot – make-up
Crystal Torres – trumpet
Benny Trickett – editing
Jennifer Turner – coordination
Cristina Villarreal – wardrobe
Horace Ward – engineer
Nick Wickham – director
Michelle Williams – guest artist
Mike "Hitman" Wilson – unknown contributor role
Travis Wilson – unspecified contributor role
Nyle Wood – sound technician
John Zweifel – stage technician

Charts

Weekly charts

Year-end charts

Certifications

Release history

References

External links
Beyoncé's official website

2007 live albums
2007 video albums
Beyoncé video albums
Columbia Records live albums
Columbia Records video albums
Live video albums
Albums produced by Beyoncé